Dichelopa honoranda is a species of moth of the family Tortricidae. It is found on Rapa Iti in the South Pacific Ocean.

References

Moths described in 1926
Dichelopa